Libertytown is an unincorporated community and census-designated place (CDP) in Frederick County, in the U.S. state of Maryland. As of the 2010 census it had a population of 950. The unofficial mayor is Sean Dixon. The Abraham Jones House was listed on the National Register of Historic Places in 1973.

Geography
The community is in eastern Frederick County, along Maryland Route 26 (Liberty Road), which leads east  to Baltimore and southwest  to Frederick. Maryland Route 75 crosses MD 26 in the center of town, leading northeast  to Union Bridge and south  to New Market. Maryland Route 31 intersects MD 26 on the east edge of town and leads northeast  to Westminster. Maryland Route 550 leaves MD 26 in the western part of town and leads northwest  to Woodsboro.

Demographics

From 2010 to 2020, the population of Libertytown increased by 3.6%.

Education
Libertytown is the location of Liberty Elementary School. Liberty opened its doors in 1927, teaching grades 1 through 12. In 1945, Liberty graduated its final senior class and continued teaching junior high until 1962.

Notre Dame Academy is a Catholic elementary school in Libertytown.

Recreation
Libertytown Park contains picnic gazebos and a county maintained rain garden. This regional park also has two baseball fields: one for Little League and another regulation-sized baseball field. Additional facilities include a basketball court, three tennis courts, and a large field space for football or soccer. A very popular spot among locals is Dirty Dixon’s. It only is accessible from within the park, but also is accessible off Dollyhide Road with additional parking. The trails runs through a native Bobwhite quail protection area maintained by Quail Forever.

References

Census-designated places in Frederick County, Maryland
Census-designated places in Maryland